The 2007 ICC World Cricket League Division Three was a cricket tournament played in Darwin, Australia between 27 May and 2 June 2007. The tournament formed part of the qualification structure for the 2011 World Cup as well as part of the wider ICC World Cricket League.

At the end of the tournament, the teams were distributed in the divisions of the ICC World Cricket League as follows:

1st and 2nd place: 2007 Division Two
3rd and 4th place: 2009 Division Three
5th to 8th place: 2008 Division Four

Teams

USA, Papua New Guinea and Uganda qualified due to their participation in the 2005 ICC Trophy. The other five teams are the next best qualifiers from their respective ICC Development Regions.

USA were suspended by the ICC and withdrawn from the tournament, with Argentina taking their place.

(Seedings indicated in brackets)

Squads

Group stage

Group A

Group B

Semifinals

Final

Plate

Final placings

Statistics

References

External links
 ICC World Cricket League Division 3 - Official Site
 ICC World Cricket League Divisions 1—5 Structure for 2006-2009 from ICC
 CricketEurope
 ICC World Cricket League Division 3 (Hong Kong Cricket Association)
 ICC World Cricket League Division 3 - Full Match Schedule (Hong Kong Cricket Association)

International cricket competitions in 2007
2007, 3